A by-election was held for the New South Wales Legislative Assembly electorate of Tamworth on 8 December 2001 because Tony Windsor resigned to successfully contest the federal seat of New England at the 2001 election.

Results

Tony Windsor resigned.

See also
Electoral results for the district of Tamworth
List of New South Wales state by-elections

References

Tamworth
New South Wales state by-elections
2000s in New South Wales
Tamowrth